Compromise is a 1925 American silent drama film directed by Alan Crosland and produced and distributed by Warner Bros. The film was based on the 1923 novel of the same name by Jay Gelzer.

Plot
As described in a review in a film magazine, Joan (Rich), a woman of high ideals, from cliildhood has had to play second fiddle to her selfish, pampered half-sister. Joan expects marriage to bring happiness and it does for a time, but Nathalie (Garon), the sister, true to form, schemes to win Joan's husband Alan (Brook) and succeeds, and, not content with this, arranges a surprise meeting to gloat over her conquest. Symbolic of the conflict between husband, wife and sister, there is a terrific cyclone which brings to Joan a realization of the truth of the theme and she forgives Alan.

Cast

Preservation
With no prints of Compromise located in any film archives, it is a lost film.

See also
List of lost films

References

External links

Lobby poster

1925 films
American silent feature films
Films directed by Alan Crosland
Lost American films
1925 drama films
Silent American drama films
American black-and-white films
1925 lost films
Lost drama films
1920s American films